The British Rail Class 508 (or 4PER) is a type of electric multiple unit (EMU) passenger train built by British Rail Engineering Limited, at Holgate Road carriage works, York, in 1979 and 1980. They were the fourth variant of British Rail's standard 1972 design for suburban EMUs, eventually encompassing 755 vehicles and five classes (313/314/315/507/508). They have worked mostly on the Merseyrail network since 1983 and continue to do so, having been refurbished by Alstom's Eastleigh Works. The Class 508 unit is now  years old.

Description
The class was developed for Merseyside, following extensive trials and testing of the 4Pep/2Pep stock that was built in the early 1970s. Testing of Class 313 took place on the Northern Line on Merseyside, using 313013/063 which were loaned from the Great Northern Line of the Eastern Region to Hall Road TMD. Original plans were drawn up for 58 Class 508s to be constructed, although costing issues limited the eventual number to 43. Following planning and building, British Rail diverted the 508s to work alongside much older first-generation 4Sub EMUs in the London Waterloo area. The first unit was delivered to Strawberry Hill depot on 9 August 1979. Based at Wimbledon Traincare Depot, they soon became problematic due to their non-standard dimensions and brake problems caused by leaf fall. 

Once a new build of Class 455 EMUs was completed, the Class 508s were sent slowly to their originally intended home on the Merseyrail network. Driver training began at Kirkdale on 17 February 1982 and the first Class 508 began service on the Northern Line the following month. The first Wirral Line service commenced on 8 June 1984 and the Class 508s had completely displaced the Class 503 fleet by the end of March 1985. The fleet was then working in parallel with the already well-established fleet of Class 507 EMUs across the River Mersey, which had been working on Merseyside since 1978.

Current operations

Merseyrail
Merseyrail operates 25 508s, which are used interchangeably between the Northern Line and the Wirral Line. They commonly work the following services:
Southport - Hunts Cross line
Liverpool Central - Ormskirk line
Liverpool Central - Kirkby line
Liverpool Lime Street - New Brighton line
Liverpool Lime Street - West Kirby line
Liverpool Lime Street - Chester line
Liverpool Lime Street - Ellesmere Port line

Merseyrail's fleet of Class 508 units are primarily maintained at Birkenhead North TMD, with minor maintenance being undertaken at Kirkdale TMD. The units, when out of service, have stabling points at various sidings around the Merseyrail network. These can be found at the station termini and the depots, as well as at Rock Ferry station and Birkenhead North station.

Past operations

Southeastern
Connex South Eastern leased twelve Class 508s freed up by capacity reductions on Merseyrail services in 1996, for operation on specific Kent services that would replace slam-door 4CEP units. They were refurbished at Eastleigh Works, including the installation of 2+2 seating and wheel-in cycle racks in the centre cars, and reclassified as the Class 508/2 (508201-212). Units were based at Gillingham Depot.

Due to their comfort and ride quality, alongside the lack of toilets and first class facilities, which were felt as a downgrade from the slam-door units they replaced, the Class 508s were unpopular with passengers. In 2005, one unit was refurbished by interim operator South Eastern Trains to improve external appearances, with a black, white and yellow livery.

In September 2006 new operator Southeastern announced that a cascade of rolling stock would see Class 466 units replace the 508s on the Sheerness and Medway Valley lines in the December 2006 timetable. Following this timetable change, the fleet's diagrams were reduced to six serviceable units, resulting in five sets being placed in "warm store" at Chart Leacon TMD, and one unit was cannibalised. With the transfer of the Tonbridge to London via Redhill services to Southern, Southeastern placed its remaining Class 508 units in store in December 2008.

Silverlink/London Overground
Silverlink leased three 508/0s in 2003 for operation on the Watford DC Line to assist its fleet of  EMUs. They were modified to make them inter-operable with 313s and were reclassified as Class 508/3. These were withdrawn following the delivery of  Capitalstar units, and the 508/3s were scrapped in 2013.

Fleet information 

Network Rail's Route Utilisation Strategy for Merseyside has called for an expansion to Merseyrail's current fleet to allow for both additional services and lengthening of trains to six cars. In December 2009 it was reported by various sources that the former Southeastern and London Overground units would be transferred to Merseyrail.

Liveries

Class 508s have appeared in many colours over their lifetimes, more so than any EMU of similar type.
BR Blue and Grey (1979–1997): the initial livery lasted until well into their careers on Merseyside. The units also carried the MPTE 69 logo and Merseyrail branding on the driver's side of the outer ends of the driving vehicles after transfer to Merseyside.

Merseyrail Original (1992–2001; repaints 2002–2004): yellow with white around the windows and black and grey stripes, exclusive to Merseyside EMUs.
Connex Yellow and White (1996–2006): white with yellow effects down the sides.

Merseyrail Revised (2000–2004): a lighter yellow, and no black stripe.
Merseyrail trial liveries (2001): One car of 508123 used for testing new liveries on each side of the carriage.
Merseyrail Refurbished (2003–2015): silver, with vertical curved yellow stripes receding from the cab ends. The passenger doors were all yellow, introduced as a safety measure by Merseyrail. 'M' branding on the front ends and the sides, and a Merseyrail vinyl. The vinyl was purchased without graffiti protection, and so it does not wear well if vandalised. Several sets are run with their 'M' logos missing or worn away.

Silverlink Metro (2003–2007): purple, green and yellow, applied when they were modified in 2003.

South Eastern Trains (2005–2006): white with yellow and black side stripes. Unit 508208 was one of the first to receive this, in May 2005.
Southeastern (April 2006 – December 2008): white, black and grey as carried by the 465/466 fleet, with the doors in corporate lilac.

London Overground (2007-2010): purple, green and yellow

Merseyrail Capital of Culture (2008–2009): based around the Merseyrail Refurbished livery, with overlain graphics. One of the four sets in the promotional Capital of Culture liveries is 508134, with the theme of creativity with a purple background. Photographs depicted focus on some of the culture of Liverpool, such as the SuperLambBanana.

Merseyrail The Beatles Story (since October 2011): blue background, with mainly-white text and graphics, advertising The Beatles Story exhibition at the Albert Dock in Liverpool. The passenger doors are all yellow, as a safety measure which was introduced, previously, by Merseyrail. The livery is applied as a vinyl skin. This livery is unique to unit number 508111.
Merseyrail Good Communications (since January 2014): six different designs, half with a yellow background, and half with a brushed metal background, applied with each set having one yellow side and one brushed metal side. Both sides have lifestyle text, in a rounded font, and graphics along a lower railway map-type stubbed stripe. The passenger doors are white on the yellow sides and yellow on the brushed metal sides. There is Merseyrail 'M' branding on each of the passenger doors, as well as on the cab fronts. The livery is applied as a vinyl skin.

Naming
Named units are as follows:

508111 - The Beatles
508123 - William Roscoe (denamed)
508136 - Capital of Culture (denamed)
508136 - Wilfred Owen MC
508207 - James D Rowlands

Accidents and incidents
On 21 April 1982, unit 508031 was running the 06:34 service from London Waterloo crashed at Shepperton, demolishing barriers and a wall. The train also slid into some new pedestrian crossing lights, rendering them unusable.  The crash was initially believed to be the result of braking tests the previous night, which involved applying grease to the tracks, and that the grease may not have been sufficiently cleaned off. It was later found that the train's brakes were faulty. 

On 26 October 2005, unit 508124, forming 2W43 17:06 West Kirby return via Liverpool Lime Street, derailed  short of Liverpool Central, caused by track gauge widening due to poor track condition. There were no serious injuries. The RAIB report cited incompatibility between Class 508 (and 507) EMUs and the Liverpool Loop track as a causal factor, along with maintenance and other track design concerns.

On 6 March 2007, a Class 508/3 unit, forming the 05:00 Tonbridge to Gatwick Airport, derailed near Crowhurst, Surrey, after hitting a fallen tree on the line. None of the eight people on board were hurt.

Replacement
On 14 May 2012, Merseytravel announced that it was beginning a project for replacement of the 508s and 507s. The lease on the Class 507s and 508s had been extended to 2018. As part of the agreement with Angel Trains, the fleet received a refresh package including external re-livery, internal enhancements and engineering work.

On 11 January 2016, Merseytravel announced the short list of companies bidding to build new trains which will replace the Class 507 and Class 508s on the Merseyrail network. In December 2016, Merseytravel announced that Stadler had won the £460million contract and that the new  trains were to be delivered from summer 2019 with all the old trains replaced by 2021.
The first unit entered service late in January 2023.

References

Sources

Further reading

508
508
Rail transport in Merseyside
Train-related introductions in 1979
750 V DC multiple units